Julian Hee (born 11 June 1978) is a former Singaporean Chinese actor and model. He was a prominently a full-time Mediacorp artiste from 2001 to 2014. His younger brother, Haden Hee, 许立楷 was also a former Mediacorp artiste.

Career

Modeling
Before entering the entertainment industry, He was a model. He won Mr. Manhunt Singapore in 2002 and represented Singapore in Manhunt International 2002, which was held in Shanghai. He was a semi-finalist in Mister World 2003.

Acting
Hee is a full-time actor, formerly signed by MediaCorp, and has performed in both English and Chinese dramas. He made his television debut on the Channel 5 show Heartlanders (seasons 3 and 4) before switching to Channel 8 Chinese-language dramas. He was nominated for the Best Newcomer in the 2005 Star Awards and the Top 10 Most Popular Male Artistes the following year.

Hee's last drama while at MediaCorp was the PerfectCut. After leaving in 2009, he became a freelance actor, starring in dramas like Game Plan .

Filmography

Films/Movies

Television

TV Appearance : As a host

Competitions/Award Ceremonies

Accolades

References

Saint Joseph's Institution, Singapore alumni
Singaporean television personalities
Singaporean male television actors
Living people
1978 births
21st-century Singaporean male actors